The 1985 Santa Clara Broncos football team represented Santa Clara University as a member if the Western Football Conference (WFC) during the 1985 NCAA Division II football season. The WFC added two new members for the 1985 season, Cal Lutheran and Sacramento State.

The Broncos were led by first-year head coach Terry Malley, who took over the coaching job when his father, Pat Malley, died in May 1985. The Broncos played home games at Buck Shaw Stadium in Santa Clara, California. They finished the season as champion of the WFC, with a record of eight wins, two losses and one tie (8–2–1, 4–0–1 WFC). The Broncos outscored their opponents 306–203 for the season.

Schedule

Team players in the NFL
The following Santa Clara Broncos players were selected in the 1986 NFL Draft.

References

Santa Clara
Santa Clara Broncos football seasons
Western Football Conference champion seasons
Santa Clara Broncos football